Mekhi Sargent (born October 8, 1997) is an American football running back for the Jacksonville Jaguars of the National Football League (NFL). He went undrafted in the 2021 NFL Draft. Sargent played college football at Iowa.

Professional career

Tennessee Titans

Sargent signed with the Tennessee Titans as an undrafted free agent on May 14, 2021. He made the 53-man roster on August 31 as the Titans' No. 3 running back on the depth chart to start the season.  He played in three games before being waived on October 23, 2021, but was re-signed to the practice squad. On November 1, 2021, Sargent was released from the practice squad.

Los Angeles Rams
Sargent was signed to the Los Angeles Rams practice squad on November 4, 2021. He was promoted to the active roster on December 8. He was waived on December 25.

Jacksonville Jaguars
Sargent was claimed off waivers by the Jacksonville Jaguars on December 27, 2021. He was waived on August 30, 2022. He signed a reserve/future contract on January 23, 2023.

References

External links
Iowa Hawkeyes bio
Tennessee Titans bio

1997 births
Living people
Iowa Western Reivers football players 
Iowa Hawkeyes football players
American football running backs
Tennessee Titans players
Los Angeles Rams players
Jacksonville Jaguars players
Key West High School alumni
People from Key West, Florida
Players of American football from Florida